John Sutton Nettlefold (23 September 1792 – 12 April 1866) was a British industrialist and entrepreneur.

Early life and family
Nettlefold was born in London. Nettlefold was a Unitarian; he married a co-religionist, Martha Chamberlain (1794–1866). Hers was a family of Birmingham manufacturers and politicians: her brother's son, Joseph Chamberlain (1836–1914), was a radical Liberal and a leading imperialist. They lived in The Grove, Highgate.

They had three sons: Edward John Nettlefold (1820–1878), Joseph Henry Nettlefold (1827–1881) and Frederick Nettlefold (1833–1913). One of Edward John's sons was named after him, John Sutton Nettlefold, who was a social reformer.

Career

In 1823, he opened a hardware store at 54 High Holborn. This was followed in 1826 by a workshop to make woodscrews based in Sunbury-on-Thames. The Sunbury factory was powered by a waterwheel and Nettlefold saw the importance of motive power when he took advantage of steam power in a new factory in Baskerville Place, off Broad Street, Birmingham. He renamed the business Nettlefold and Sons, Ltd., and it expanded rapidly in London and Birmingham.

In 1854, Nettlefold acquired the opportunity to purchase a licence to manufacture to a U.S. patent for a novel woodscrew. The licence, and the establishment of a new factory, demanded an investment of £ 30,000. Nettlefold sought and obtained the involvement of his brother-in-law as equal partner for an investment of £10,000 and the two established a factory in Smethwick, leaving its management to their sons, Edward John and Joseph Henry Nettlefold, and Joseph Chamberlain.

In later years, the management of the partnership, Nettlefold and Chamberlain, was passed to Joseph and Frederick Nettlefold, and later was absorbed into Guest, Keen and Nettlefolds, now GKN plc, a multinational engineering company headquartered in Redditch.

References

Bibliography

Smith, B.D.M (2004) "Nettlefold, Joseph Henry (1827-1881)", rev., Oxford Dictionary of National Biography, Oxford University Press, accessed 27 July 2005 

1792 births
1866 deaths
History of Birmingham, West Midlands
19th-century English businesspeople